Zhuge Yujie (born May 1971), is a Chinese politician, and the current deputy party secretary of the Party Committee of Hubei. Having spent his entire career in Shanghai, Zhuge has served variously in state-owned enterprises supporting the Port of Shanghai and local leadership roles. Zhuge has been described as a key member of the "7th Generation" of Chinese leadership, and has been speculated to be a potential future successor to Xi Jinping as paramount leader of China.

Biography 
Zhuge Yujie was born in Shanghai. He began work in August 1992, and joined the Communist Party of China in June 1992. He began work as part of the technical staff of a construction company operating at the Port of Shanghai; he rose through the ranks to take on administrative roles. In July 1999, he was named party chief and general manager of the Shanghai Port Industry Company (上海港务工程公司). In November 2005, he became chief executive of the Shanghai Yangshan Tongsheng Port Construction Company. In February 2009, he was named deputy governor of Putuo District, Shanghai. In February 2011, he became the president and deputy party chief of the Shanghai International Port Holdings Co. 
In April 2013, Zhuge was named Governor of Yangpu District. In January 2015, he assumed the post of the party chief of Yangpu District.

In July 2016, he was named chief of the general office of the Shanghai Party Committee, and deputy secretary-general. In March 2017, he was named a member of the Shanghai municipal party standing committee after being promoted to secretary-general, taking on the post vacated by Yin Hong. At the time of his appointment, he was the youngest person with a seat on a provincial level standing committee.

In March 2023, Zhuge was transferred to Hubei to serve as a deputy secretary of the Communist Party Committee of Hubei.

References 

People's Republic of China politicians from Shanghai

1971 births
Living people
Political office-holders in Shanghai